Dianhong tea (pronounced ) is a type of relatively high-end, gourmet Chinese black tea sometimes used in various tea blends and grown in Yunnan Province, China. The main difference between Dianhong and other Chinese black teas is the amount of fine leaf buds, or "golden tips," present in the dried tea. Dianhong tea produces a brew that is brassy golden orange in colour with a sweet, gentle aroma and no astringency. Cheaper varieties of Dianhong produce a darker brownish brew that can be very bitter.

History and etymology

Teas grown in Yunnan prior to the Han dynasty (206BCE220CE) were typically produced in a compressed form similar to modern pu'er tea. Dian hong is a relatively new product from Yunnan that began production in the early 20th century. The word  is the short name for the Yunnan region while  means "red (tea)"; as such, these teas are sometimes simply referred to as Yunnan red or Yunnan black. However, such references are often confusing due to the other varieties of teas produced in Yunnan.

Varieties
Broken Yunnan: A cheap tea used for blending which contains very few golden buds and is generally bitter on its own. This tea is easily identified by the largely black dried leaves with only a few bursts of golden tips. The brew is dark and not brassy but reddish brown. The taste can sometimes be as strong as cooked pu-erh tea. Classified in Orange pekoe grading as BOP.
Yunnan Gold: A dianhong with fewer golden buds and more dark tea leaves. It is on par with the pure gold, and is priced similarly, but makes teas with slightly different characteristics. The brew has a brassy red color different from other black teas and a vivid sweetness not quite as intense as "Yunnan pure gold". Classified in Orange pekoe grading from OP to TGFOP.
Yunnan Pure Gold: Considered the best type of Dian hong tea. It contains only golden tips, which are usually covered in fine hairs. When viewed from a distance, the dried tea appears bright orange in colour. The tea liquor is bright red in colour and exhibits a gentle aroma and a sweet taste.  The leaves are reddish brown after being brewed.  Classified in Orange pekoe grading from TGFOP to SFTGFOP.
Golden needle is a pure black variety of dianhong. The leaves are golden in color and yield an amberish infusion.
Pine Needle is a preparation technology developed in the 20th century preserving straight leaf form, which makes a mix of differently coloured leaves reminiscent of old needles fallen off a pine tree. Non-curved leaves are a rather common shape for lightly fermented green teas, however for black teas this is a novelty.

See also
 Keemun tea
 Pu'er tea, another variety of tea commonly produced in Yunnan.

References

Black tea
Chinese teas
Chinese tea grown in Yunnan